Morocco competed at the 1988 Summer Olympics in Seoul, South Korea.

Competitors
The following is the list of number of competitors in the Games.

Medalists

Results by event

Athletics
Men's 800 metres
 Saïd Aouita
 Faouzi Lahbi

Men's 1,500 metres
 Moustafa Lachaal
 Abdel Majid Moncef
 Saïd Aouita

Men's 10,000 metres
 Brahim Boutayeb 
 First Round — 28:17.61
 Final — 27:21.46 (→  Gold Medal)

Men's Marathon
 Noureddine Sobhi 
 Final — 2:19.56 (→ 30th place)

 El Mostafa Nechchadi
 Final — did not finish (→ no ranking)

Men's 3.000m Steeplechase
 Abdelaziz Sahere
 Heat — DSQ (→ did not advance)

Women's 100 metres
 Méryem Oumezdi

Women's 1,500 metres
 Fatima Aouam

Women's 3,000 metres
 Fatima Aouam

Women's 10,000 metres
 Hassania Darami

Boxing
Light Flyweight (– 48 kg)
Mahjoub M'jirih
 First Round — Bye
 Second Round — defeated Ochiryn Demberel (MGL), 3:2
 Third Round — defeated Thomas Chisenga (ZAM), 5:0 
 Quarterfinals — lost to Leopoldo Serrantes (PHI), RSC-3

Men's Flyweight (– 51 kg)
Aissa Moukrim
 First Round — Bye
 Second Round — lost to Benaissa Abed (ALS), 2:3

Men's Bantamweight (– 54 kg)
Mohammed Achik
 First Round — lost to Jimmy Majanya (SWE), 1:4

Men's Featherweight (– 57 kg)
Abdelhak Achik →  Bronze Medal
 First Round — Bye
 Second Round — defeated Francisco Avelar (ELS), 4:1 
 Third Round — defeated Omar Catari (VEN), KO-1 
 Quarterfinals — defeated Liu Dong (CHN), KO-1
 Semifinals — lost to Giovanni Parisi (ITA), RSC-1

Men's Lightweight (– 60 kg)
Kamal Marjouane
 First Round — Bye
 Second Round — defeated Tommy Gbay (LBR), 5:0
 Third Round — defeated Héctor Arroyo (PUR), 5:0
 Quarterfinals — lost to Nergüin Enkhbat (MGL), 0:5

Men's Light Welterweight (– 63.5 kg)
Khalid Rahilou
 First Round — defeated Avaavau Avaavau (SAM), RSC-3
 Second Round — lost to Lyton Mphande (MLW), walk-over

Men's Welterweight (– 67 kg)
Abdellah Taouane 
 First Round — defeated Đỗ Tiến Tuấn (VIE), 5:0 
 Second Round — lost to Siegfried Mehnert (GDR), 0:5

Judo
Men's Half-Lightweight
Driss El-Mamoun

Men's Lightweight
Abdelhak Maach

Men's Half-Heavyweight
Ahmed Barbach

Men's Heavyweight
Abderrahim Lahcinia

Women's  half-lightweight (demonstration)
Khadija Haouati

Wrestling
Men's Greco-Roman Flyweight
Abderrahman Naanaa

Men's Greco-Roman Bantamweight 
Kacem Bouallaouche

Men's Greco-Roman Featherweight 
Brahim Loksairi

Men's Greco-Roman Lightweight
Saïd Souaken

Men's Greco-Roman Welterweight
Abdel Aziz Tahir

References

sports-reference
Official Olympic Reports
International Olympic Committee results database

Nations at the 1988 Summer Olympics
1988
1988 in Moroccan sport